Miss Earth United Kingdom (previously Miss Earth Great Britain) is a Beauty pageant that chooses women to represent the United Kingdom at the Miss Earth pageant.

History
Miss Earth United Kingdom was held for first time in 2005. Before Miss Earth UK was launched in 2005, delegates were send by other organisations to Miss Earth. In 2002 and 2004 the representatives of United Kingdom were used as Miss Great Britain at Miss Earth pageant. 

In 2006, the Miss Earth UK sent the winners named as Miss England and Miss Wales to the Miss Earth pageant. 

In 2007, the Miss Earth UK added Miss Northern Ireland to compete as well at Miss Earth pageant.

In 2008, the Miss Earth UK added Miss Scotland for participation at the Miss Earth pageant.

Nowadays, the Miss Earth UK contestants are informed, goal-oriented, and committed to playing a part in preserving and protecting the environment for future generations. Miss Earth UK winners are ambassadors to environmental protection campaigns. The contestants focus on and promote environmental awareness for a clean, natural and healthy environment.

Contests
The UK Grand Final Crowning & Award Ceremony is an event of style and glamour where a green goddess of the United Kingdom is selected to become an Ambassador of beauty and voice to promote a green and healthy life style for all generations. In 2020, the delegate competed in Miss Earth under Miss Earth United Kingdom of Great Britain. In 2021, the national competition sent contestants from England, Scotland and Wales.

Titleholders

As Great Britain/United Kingdom
Color key

Traditionally since 2006 the Miss Earth UK will be representing Great Britain as Miss England, Northern Ireland, Scotland, and Wales at Miss Earth pageant until 2019.

As England, Northern Ireland, Scotland and Wales
After deciding to send four constituent countries of the United Kingdom in 2006. The Miss Earth UK always crowned the four candidates for competing at Miss Earth pageant.
{| class="wikitable" style="text-align:center; font-size:90%; line-height:17px; width:90%;"
|-
! style="width:06%;" scope="col" | Year
! style="width:16%;" scope="col" | 
! style="width:16%;" scope="col" | 
! style="width:16%;" scope="col" | 
! style="width:16%;" scope="col" | 
|-
! 2006
| Holly Ikin
| ×
| ×
| Laura Jane Livesey
|-
! 2007
| Clair Cooper
| Aine Gormley
| ×
| Sarah Michelle Fleming 
|-
! 2008
| Caroline Elizabeth Duffy
| Gemma Michelle Walker
| Courtney St. John
| Jamie-Lee Williams
|-
! 2009
| Kirsty Nichol
| style="background:#FFFACD;" |Kayleigh O’Reilly(Top 16)
| Sarah Jean Finlay
| Dominique Louise Dyer
|-
! 2010
| Sandra Marie Lees
| Judith Keys
| Cora Buchanan
| Louise Hinder
|-
! 2011
| Roxanne Smith
| Alixandra Halliday
| Amanda Quinn
| Emma Franklin 
|-
! 2012
| Zahida Begum
| Ciara Walker
| style="background:#FFFACD;" | Sara Pendar(Top 16)
| Zoe Kinsella 
|-
! 2013
| Chloe Othen
| Amira Graham
| Kiera Kingsman
| Angharad James
|-
! 2014
| Gabriella Gatehouse
| Justine McEleney
| style="background:#FFFACD;" |Romy McCahill(Top 16)
| 
|-
! 2015
| Katrina Kendall
| Dearbhlá Walsh
| style="background-color:#FFFACD; "| Amy Meisak  (Top 16) 
| Lara Stephen
|-
! 2016
| style="background:#FFFACD;" |Luissa Burton(Top 16)
| style="background:#FFFACD;" |Julieann McStravick(Top 16)
| ×
| Charlotte Hitchman 
|-
! 2017
| Charlotte Sophie Brooke
| Maire Lynch
| ×
| Sophie Bettridge
|-
! 2018
| Abbey-Anne Gyles
| Christie van Schalkwyk
| ×
| ×
|-
! 2019
| style="background:#FFFACD;" |Stephanie Wyatt(Top 20)| Shannon McCullagh
| ×
| ×
|-
! 2020
| ×
| ×
| ×
| ×
|-
! 2021
| Kate Marie 
| ×
| ×
| ×
|-
! 2022
| Beth Rice 
| ×
| Marcie Reid 
| Shereen Brogan  
|}

Notes
2009: Clair Cooper (Miss Earth England 2007) won the title of Miss Universe GB 2009 and competed at Miss Universe 2009 in Nassau, the Bahamas.
2009: Kayleigh O’Reilly (Miss Earth Northern Ireland 2009) placed for first time at Miss Earth 2009 in Manila, the Philippines as the Top 16.
2010: Sandra Marie Lees (Miss Earth England 2010) won the title of Miss Tourism Great Britain 2010.
2010: Louise Hinder (Miss Earth Wales 2010) competed at Miss Universe GB 2010 and represented Wales at the pageant. She failed to get a crown of the Miss Universe Great Britain.
2011: Jamie-Lee Williams (Miss Earth Wales 2008) won the title of Miss United Kingdom Galaxy 2011'''.
2012: Sara Pendar (Miss Earth Scotland 2012) placed for first time at Miss Earth 2012 in Manila, the Philippines as the Top 16.

See also
Miss Great Britain
Miss Universe Great Britain
Miss United Kingdom

References

External links
Official website
Official page

Miss Earth by country
Lists of British women
United Kingdom
2005 establishments in the United Kingdom
Recurring events established in 2005
Annual events in the United Kingdom
British awards